FC Zhemchuzhina Budyonnovsk was a Russian football team from Budyonnovsk. It played professionally from 1991 to 1994 and from 2002 to 2004. Their best result was 6th place in Zone 1 of the Russian Second Division in 1993.

Team name history
 1991–1994 – FC Druzhba Budyonnovsk
 2001 – FC Zhemchuzhina-Lukoil Budyonnovsk
 2002–2004 – FC Zhemchuzhina Budyonnovsk

External links
  Team history at KLISF

Association football clubs established in 1991
Association football clubs disestablished in 2005
Defunct football clubs in Russia
Sport in Stavropol Krai
1991 establishments in Russia
2005 disestablishments in Russia